The Hefei University of Technology (HFUT) is a national public university in Hefei, Anhui, China. The university is part of China's Double First Class University Plan and the former Project 211.

HFUT has four campuses, namely, Tunxilu, Lu’anlu, Feicuihu and Xuancheng, covering an area of about 3,417,390 m². The first three campuses are all located in Hefei, the provincial capital of Anhui, and the fourth in Xuancheng, a city about 194 kilometers away from Hefei.
 
Campuses in Hefei have 19 schools covering a wide range of fields with a strong focus on engineering science. The schools offer 82 undergraduate programs, 32  first-level disciples with authorization to confer master's degrees, 12  first-level disciples for doctoral programs as well as 12 post-doctoral programs. 4 disciplines are selected as national key disciplines, 28 provincial key disciplines. The university has 1 state key lab, 1 national engineering lab, 4 national university-industry joint engineering research centers and 46 research centers at the ministerial or provincial level as well as 1 national A-level architectural design and research institute. The campus in Xuancheng has 5 departments.
 
At present, HFUT enrolls 29,480 undergraduate students and 11,800 graduate students. It has made remarkable achievements in student education. Throughout the years, key disciplines, courses, textbooks, teaching and experiment centers, teaching staff of HFUT have won numerous awards at all levels, highly reputed in China. It is among the first batch of 61 pilot colleges and universities to conduct the Education and Development Plan for Outstanding Engineers initiated by the Ministry of Education. About 200 projects carried out by HFUT students have been funded by the National University Student Innovation Program.
 
In 2013, the university had an annual research funding in sciences of over RMB 447 Million. Total number of applications for invention patents was 357, of which 204 have been licensed. 82 computer software patents were granted. In recent years, HFUT won 5 national science-and-technology-related awards, and 19 first prizes at the ministerial or provincial level.

Schools and Colleges in HFUT
 School of Marxism
 School of Electronic Science and Applied Physics
 Technician College of Hefei University and Technology
 College of Continuing Education
 Department of Sports and Physical Education
 School of Microelectronics
 School of Foreign Languages
 School of Mathematics
 School of Software
 School of Traffic and Transportation Engineering
 School of Civil Engineering
 School of Management
 School of Computer Science and Information Engineering
 School of Materials Science & Engineering
 School of Architecture and Arts
 School of Economics
 School of Mechanical and Automotive Engineering
 School of Biotechnology and Food Engineering
 School of Chemistry and Chemical Engineering
 School of Electrical Engineering and Automation
 School of Resources and Environmental Engineering

Notable alumni 

Miao Wei - Minister of Ministry of Industry and Information Technology of the People's Republic of China
Ning jizhe - Minister of National Bureau of Statistics of the People's Republic of China 
Ni Yuefeng - Minister of General Administration Customs  (the People's Republic of China )
Zhong Ziran - Director of Geological Survey of China 
Ye Qing - Chairman of China Shenhua Group
Zhu Yicai - Chairman of China Yurun Group
Zhaojianguo - Chairman of China Huadian Corporation
Xie Biao - Chairman of CMEC
Zhang Wei - Chairman of CHINA JIKAN RESEARCH INSTITUTE OF ENGINEERING INVESTIGATIONS AND DESIGN
Li Fusheng - Chairman of China Xuji Corporation
Chen Weinong - Chairman of China Automotive Technology&Research Center 
Yin Tengyue - CEO/Chairman of Chery Automobile Co., Ltd.
liu Hanru - CEO/Chairman of HUALINGXINGMA Group
Xiao Zhenghai - CEO/Chairman of Anhui Quanchai Group
Feng Xin - CEO of Storm group Limited by Share Ltd
Xi GuoHua - was the chairman of Chinamobile Group /was the Vice Minister of Ministry of Industry and Information Technology of the People's Republic of China

References

 http://en.hfut.edu.cn/list-139-1.html
 http://en.hfut.edu.cn/list-135-1.html

External links

Panorama
 Tunxi Avenue Campus
 Lake Emerald Campus

 
Universities and colleges in Hefei
Project 211
Educational institutions established in 1945
1945 establishments in China